The 2022 Honda Idemitsu Talent Cup is the eighth season of the Asia Talent Cup. Malaysian rider Hakim Danish won the championship, following Japanese rider Shinya Ezawa in second and Indonesian rider Veda Ega Pratama in third.

Entry list

Calendar
The following Grand prix were the scheduled Grand prix for the 2022 Asia Talent Cup.

Results

The following results are the official race results of the 2022 Asia Talent Cup:

Riders' Championship standings

Scoring System

Points are awarded to the top fifteen finishers. A rider has to finish the race to earn points.